Martina Navratilova defeated Evonne Goolagong Cawley in the final, 7–6, 6–4 to win the singles tennis title at the 1978 Virginia Slims Championships. It was her first Tour Finals singles title, and the first of an eventual record eight such titles.

Chris Evert was the reigning champion, but did not qualify this year.

Seeds

Draw

Finals

Round robin

Gold group

Orange group

See also
WTA Tour Championships appearances

References
Official Results Archive (ITF)
Official Results Archive (WTA)

Singles
Tennis in California
1978 WTA Tour